William Neufeld (February 27, 1901 – October 11, 1992) was an American track and field athlete who competed in the 1924 Summer Olympics. He was born in Molotschna and died in Riverside, California. In 1924 he finished fifth in the javelin throw competition.

References

External links

Interview with William Neufeld

1901 births
1992 deaths
American male javelin throwers
Olympic track and field athletes of the United States
Athletes (track and field) at the 1924 Summer Olympics